Decrepit Birth is an American death metal band from Santa Cruz, California. They have released two studio albums through Unique Leader Records and two through Nuclear Blast, and a demo independently. All of their studio albums feature artwork by renowned fantasy artist Dan Seagrave.

In October 2021, it was announced vocalist Bill Robinson was taking an "extended hiatus" from the band and was being replaced by Mac Smith, who would tour with the band for the foreseeable future. However, in March 2022, the band announced an upcoming tour in July and that Bill Robinson would be returning on vocals.

Band members

Current members
 Bill Robinson – lead vocals (2001–present)
 Matt Sotelo – guitars, backing vocals (2001–present)
 Sam "Samus" Paulicelli Jr. – drums (2010–present)
 Sean Martinez – bass (2013–present)

Current live members
 Gabe Seeber – drums (2013–present)

Former members
 Derek Boyer – bass (2001–2003, 2011–2012)
 Tim Yeung – drums (2003)
 KC Howard – drums (2004–2010)
 Risha Eryavec – bass (2004–2007)
 Mike Turner – guitars (2004–2006)
 Joel Horner – bass (2006–2011)
 Dan Eggers – guitars (2008–2010)
 Chase Fraser – guitars (2010–2015)

Live members
 Lee Smith – drums (2010–2011)
 Alex Bent – drums (2013)
 A.J. Lewandowski – bass (2013)
 Mac Smith – vocals (2021–2022)

Timeline

Discography
Studio albums
 ...And Time Begins (2003)
 Diminishing Between Worlds (2008)
 Polarity (2010)
 Axis Mundi (2017)

References

External links
 Official website

2001 establishments in California
Death metal musical groups from California
Musical groups established in 2001
Musical quartets
Nuclear Blast artists